Cheshmeh Tala (also Romanized as Cheshmeh Ţalā) is a village in Qalayi Rural District, Firuzabad District, Selseleh County, Lorestan Province, Iran. At the 2006 census, its population was 243, in 46 families.

References 

Towns and villages in Selseleh County